Relative Dementias is a BBC Books original novel written by Mark Michalowski and based on the long-running British science fiction television series Doctor Who. It features the Seventh Doctor and Ace.

Ace's name
Ace's full name is given as Dorothy Gale McShane. 
This resolves a naming anomaly created during sequence of BBC Books' Past Doctor Adventures set after Survival and written by Mike Tucker and Robert Perry. They had used the name 'Dorothy Gale', as the authors were unaware that the name 'McShane' had been used in the New Adventures novels.

Continuity
 Dorothy Gale McShane is given as Ace's full name in the Big Finish audio drama The Rapture.

2002 British novels
2002 science fiction novels
Past Doctor Adventures
Seventh Doctor novels
Novels by Mark Michalowski